Highland High School is located in Palmdale, California and is part of the Antelope Valley Union High School District. About 4,000 students attend Highland High School in grades 9 through 12. It received a California Distinguished School award in 2005.

Highland High School was founded in 1989 in response to Palmdale's rapid population growth. Palmdale High School was not large enough to serve the children of the new families moving into the Antelope Valley. Highland High School is now the largest high school under the Antelope Valley Union High School District.
Sports
 
Girls tennis, 
Boys tennis,
Girls golf,
Boys golf,
Girls soccer,
Boys soccer,
Girls basketball, 
Boys basketball, 
Baseball,
Softball,
Football,
and Swim.
Highland High school most popular sport is football with many CIF championships including be the top team in the AV School District.

Demographics
The demographic breakdown of the 3,032 students enrolled in 2013-14 was:
Male - 51.1%
Female - 48.9%
Native American/Alaskan - 1.1%
Asian/Pacific islanders - 5.9%
Black - 16.0%
Hispanic - 55.1%
White - 19.1%
Multiracial - 2.8%

53.9% of the students were eligible for free or reduced lunch.

Notable alumni
 Kurt Caselli, motocross racer
 Marcus Demps, NFL football player
 Will Demps, NFL football player 
 Sean Franklin, MLS Soccer player 
 Shauna Gambill, Miss Teen USA 1994
 Jason Kubel, Major League Baseball player 
 Ryan Millar, Olympic volleyball player
 DeShawn Shead, NFL football player 
 Rachel Garcia, softball pitcher

References

External links

Education in Palmdale, California
Educational institutions established in 1989
High schools in Los Angeles County, California
International Baccalaureate schools in California
Public high schools in California
1989 establishments in California